See also Ford Crestline Skyliner for the 1954 Ford and Ford Fairlane Crown Victoria Skyliner for the 1955–1956 Ford Fairlane Crown Victoria, both with an acrylic glass roof panel.

The Ford Fairlane 500 Skyliner is a two-door full-size retractable hardtop convertible, manufactured and marketed by Ford Motor Company for model years 1957–1959.  For the model year 1959, the name changed to  Ford Fairlane 500 Galaxie Skyliner shortly after production began (also illustrated as such in the brochure but described only as "Galaxy" in the related text.). The retractable roof mechanism, marketed as the "Hide-Away Hardtop",  was unique to Ford-branded products, and was not offered on Continental, Lincoln, Mercury, or Edsel branded vehicles. A total of 48,394 were manufactured.

Design

Falling in Ford's Fairlane 500 range, the Skyliner Retractable was only the second car in history to be mass-produced with a retractable hardtop (following the 1938 |Peugeot 402 Eclipse Decapotable); the first to reach four and five-digit mass-production numbers, and the first series produced coupé convertible to feature a roof using two segments. At its introduction, the Skyliner was the only true hardtop convertible.  

The Skyliner's retractable top operated via a complex mechanism that folded the front of the roof and retracted it under the rear decklid. The top largely consumed available trunk space, limiting the car's sales, though the mechanism operated reliably. Production totaled 20,766 units in 1957, declining to 14,713 in 1958 and to 12,915 in 1959. An electric clock was standard. Fuel consumption was around  overall. The fuel tank was placed vertically in back of the rear seat, offering increased safety in a rear collision.

During the 1959 model year, Ford added the new top-of-the-line Galaxie series to its full-size lineup, and the Skyliner model became part of that series. Although the 1959 Galaxie was designated as a separate series, Galaxies carried both “Fairlane 500” and “Galaxie” badging, on the rear and sides respectively. It came with the standard  2-barrel  V8 engine.

Requiring a shorter roof and longer trunk, the retractable roof concept was originally intended for Ford's Continental brand.  The mechanism's complexity would have required an even more expensive marketing position for a Continental, and when Ford projected losses for this route, the company re-conceived the model and restyled it from the waist down — projecting it would attract more buyers under the Ford brand. Though prescient, the concept ultimately attracted more attention than sales; it was expensive, thought to be unreliable, and consumed almost all trunk space when retracted. The listed retail price was US$2,942 ($ in  dollars ) with several items available optionally like power windows, power-adjustable front seat, power steering, power brakes, heater and windshield defroster.

Although the actual mechanicals differed, the Skyliner's retractable roof design was later adopted for the Lincoln Continental fabric convertibles of 1961–67.

Engines and transmissions
The following engines, all V8s, were available on the Fairlane 500 Skyliner.

Two manual transmissions, a three-speed and three-speed overdrive, and a three-speed Ford-O-Matic automatic transmission. Starting in 1958, Cruise-O-Matic was added, which provided a second "drive" range ("D2"), allowing for an intermediate gear start.

Crestline Skyliner & Fairlane Crown Victoria Skyliner
Ford had used the Skyliner name on earlier models, namely the two-door hardtop Crestline Skyliner of 1954 and the Fairlane Crown Victoria Skyliner coupe of 1955 and 1956. These models feature a clear acrylic glass roof panel over the front seats.

Notes

Bibliography

External links
 
 International Ford Retractable Club

Fairlane 500 Skyliner
Cars introduced in 1957